William L. Ball (July 18, 1908 – March 14, 1979) was a Canadian alpine, cross-country, and Nordic combined skier who competed in the 1936 Winter Olympics.

Ball was born in North Hatley, Quebec. In 1936 he finished 54th in the 18 kilometre cross-country skiing event and 46th in the Nordic combined skiing competition. He also participated in the alpine skiing combined event but was unplaced due to not finishing the second slalom heat.

Ball was inducted into the Canadian Ski Hall of Fame in 1982.

References

External links
 Canadian Ski Hall of Fame biography

1908 births
1979 deaths
Canadian male alpine skiers
Canadian male cross-country skiers
Canadian male Nordic combined skiers
Olympic alpine skiers of Canada
Olympic cross-country skiers of Canada
Olympic Nordic combined skiers of Canada
Alpine skiers at the 1936 Winter Olympics
Cross-country skiers at the 1936 Winter Olympics
Nordic combined skiers at the 1936 Winter Olympics